Ahmed Hamoudi (born 30 July 1990) is an Egyptian footballer who plays as an attacking midfielder for Egyptian Premier League club Pyramids.

Club career

Smouha
Hamoudi played his youth football with Smouha Sporting Club and advanced to their first team in 2010. In his first season he played regularly. Following the Port Said Stadium riot on 1 February 2012, the Egyptian Premier League was suspended, and on 10 March 2012, the Egyptian Football Association announced their decision to cancel the remainder of the season. The following season play restarted, however, after the 2013 Egyptian coup d'état on 3 July 2013, the Egyptian season was suspended for security reasons, and a decision was reached to cancel the remainder of the season. The next season was again played in full and Hamoudi with Smouha were runners-up in the championship.

Basel
On 29 July 2014 Basel announced that they had signed Hamoudi on a four-year contract. He joined Basel's first team for their 2014–15 season under head coach Paulo Sousa. After playing in one test game, Hamoudi played his debut played for his new club in the Swiss Cup away game on 23 August 2014 as Basel won 4–0 against CS Italien (GE). He played his domestic league debut and scored his first league goal in the home game in St. Jakob-Park on 23 September 2014. It was the last goal of the match and the pass came from his Egyptian teammate Mohamed Elneny, as Basel won 3–1 against Vaduz.

The season 2014–15 was a successful one for Basel. Basel entered the Champions League in the group stage. They reached the knockout phase on 9 December 2014, as they managed a 1–1 draw at Anfield against Liverpool. But they were knocked out of the competition by Porto in the round of 16. At the end of the 2014–15 season, Basel won the championship for the sixth time in a row. In the 2014–15 Swiss Cup Basel reached the final. However, for the third time in a row they finished as runners-up.

However, Hamoudi failed to make a lasting impression during that season under trainer Paulo Sousa. Of the 50 competition matches (36 Swiss League fixtures – 6 Swiss Cup and 8 Champions League) that Basel played that season, Hamoudi appeared in just 20 and he was mainly used as a substitute. So for the next season Hamoudi was loaned out to Zamalek. Somewhat more than a year later, on 31 August, Basel announced that the contract between them and the 26-year-old Egyptian international Hamoudi had been resolved on mutual consent with immediate effect. During his season with the club, Hamoudy played a total of 28 games for Basel scoring a total of three goals. Twelve of these games were in the Swiss Super League, four in the Swiss Cup, four in the 2014–15 Champions League and four were friendly games. He scored one goal in the domestic league, one in the cup and the other was scored during the test games.

Zamalek
On Sunday 5 August 2015 Hamoudi joined Zamalek on loan until the end of the 2015–16 season, he made his debut on 23 August 2015 and scored twice in the 3–1 away win against CS Sfaxien in the fifth round of the 2015 CAF Confederation Cup group stage.

Al Ahly
On 30 January 2017, Hamoudi joined Al Ahly from Al Batin.

Honors

Club
Basel
 Swiss Super League: 2014–15
 Swiss Cup runner up: 2014–15

Zamalek SC
 Egypt Cup: 2014–15

Al Ahly
 Egyptian Premier League: 2016–17, 2017–18, 2018–19
 Egypt Cup: 2017
 Egyptian Super Cup: 2017

Individual
 Egypt Cup Top Goalscorer: 2014 (6 goals)

References

External links

Profile at Swiss Football League Website 

1990 births
Living people
Egyptian footballers
Egypt international footballers
Egyptian expatriate footballers
Swiss Super League players
Saudi Professional League players
Egyptian Premier League players
Smouha SC players
FC Basel players
Zamalek SC players
Al Batin FC players
Al Ahly SC players
Pyramids FC players
Egyptian expatriate sportspeople in Switzerland
Egyptian expatriate sportspeople in Saudi Arabia
Expatriate footballers in Switzerland
Expatriate footballers in Saudi Arabia
Association football midfielders
Sportspeople from Alexandria